Lobogenesis eretmognathos is a species of moth of the family Tortricidae. It is found in Pichincha Province, Ecuador.

References

Moths described in 2005
Euliini